Robert Clinton Blanche (March 30, 1962 – January 3, 2020) was an American film and television actor.

Early life 
Blanche was born in Pomona, California, and raised in Oregon.

Career 
Beginning his film and television career in 1994, Blanche appeared in over seventy film and television projects. Among other works, he recurred in a guest-starring role as Lt. Bonanno (and later Capt. Det. Bonanno) on three seasons of the TNT series Leverage. He recurred in the role of Sgt. Franco on NBC's Grimm.

Filmography

Film

Television

References

External links
 

1962 births
2020 deaths
American male film actors
Place of death missing
Place of birth missing
American male television actors